Regita (Reġatha) is a village (selo) in Kurchaloyevsky District, Chechnya.

Administrative and municipal status 
Municipally, Regita is incorporated as Regitinskoye rural settlement. It is the administrative center of the municipality and is one of four settlements included in it.

Geography 

Regita is located in the upper reaches of the Khumys River.

The nearest settlements to Regita are Belty and Khidi-Khutor in the north-east, Koren-Benoy in the east, Achereshki in the south-east, Guni in the south, Marzoy-Mokhk in the south-west, and Dzhaglargi in the north-west.

History 
In 1944, after the genocide and deportation of the Chechen and Ingush people and the Chechen-Ingush ASSR was abolished, the village of Regita was renamed, and settled by people from the neighbouring republic of Dagestan.

In 1958, after the Vaynakh people returned and the Chechen-Ingush ASSR was restored, the village regained its old Chechen name, Regita.

Population 
 2002 Census: 685
 2010 Census: 783
 2018 estimate: ?

According to the 2010 Census, the majority of residents of Regita were ethnic Chechens.

References 

Rural localities in Kurchaloyevsky District